In Reddy v Siemens Telecommunications (Pty) Ltd, the Supreme Court of Appeal (SCA) upheld the enforceability of a restraint of trade clause.

Facts 
Reddy was employed by Siemens as a solutions integrator. As such, he was trained in respect of Siemens products and networks, as well as in respect of the application of software used in the cellular telecommunications industry. When he resigned, he took up employment with Ericsson (a competitor).

Reddy had signed an agreement in terms of which he undertook not to work for a competitor for a period of one year after termination of his employment. He had also undertaken not to disclose trade secrets and confidential information belonging to Siemens. The restraint was aimed at preventing a person (in this case Reddy), with knowledge of confidential technologies, from utilising this information to the detriment of Siemens.

Judgment 
The court held that Reddy was in the possession of trade secrets and confidential knowledge. More in particular, he had knowledge about the processes, methodologies and system architecture developed by Siemens. The court found that the information that Reddy had, if disclosed, could be used to the disadvantage of Siemens. The risk of disclosure was considered by the court to be sufficient. Reddy was accordingly held to his contractual undertakings.

See also 
 Labour law
 Interim order
 Restraint of trade
 South African labour law

References

Case law 
 David Crouch Marketing CC v Du Plessis [2009] JOL 23835 (LC).
 Reddy v Siemens Telecommunications (Pty) Ltd 2007 (2) SA 486 (SCA).

Notes 

Supreme Court of Appeal of South Africa cases
2007 in South African law
2007 in case law
South African labour case law
Siemens